Xiu Xiu is an American experimental indie band.

Xiu Xiu may also refer to:

Xiu Xiu (pentathlete) (born 1987), female Chinese modern pentathlete
Xiu Xiu: The Sent Down Girl, 1998 Chinese film directed by actress Joan Chen
Valen Hsu (born 1974), also known as Xiu Xiu, Taiwanese female singer